The 2020–21 season was the 72nd season in existence of Unión Deportiva Las Palmas and the club's third consecutive season in the second division of Spanish football. In addition to the domestic league, Las Palmas participated in this season's edition of the Copa del Rey. The season covered the period from 26 July 2020 to 30 June 2021.

Players

First-team squad
.

Other players under contract

Reserve team

Out on loan

Transfers

In

Out

Pre-season and friendlies

Competitions

Overview

Segunda División

League table

Results summary

Results by round

Matches
The league fixtures were announced on 31 August 2020.

Copa del Rey

Statistics

Goalscorers

Notes

References

External links

UD Las Palmas seasons
UD Las Palmas